Timmelsjoch, (elevation ) is a high mountain pass that creates a link through the Ötztal Alps along the border between Austria and Italy.

The Timmelsjoch connects the Ötztal valley in the Austrian state of Tyrol to the Passeier Valley in the Italian province of South Tyrol, as it bridges the saddle point between the Jochköpfl and Wurmkogl peaks to its northeast and southwest, respectively.

History
During the early Stone Age, shepherds and their flocks lived in the Obergurgl area near Timmelsjoch. By the early Bronze Age, the glaciers of the last Ice Age were retreating and various hunters, adventurers, and wandering tribes entered the higher elevations in the area in search of game and treasure. The discovery of a brooch near the Schönbodenlacke dating from the La Tène period (around 300 BC) indicates that people were passing over the Timmelsjoch during this period.

By the Middle Ages, mining influenced the development of a road network in the area. Marble quarries, semiprecious stones, and oil shales were all exploited. The ancient path over the Timmelsjoch was one of many such roads in the Tyrol which helped facilitate trade and would have a profound social, cultural, political, and religious impact on the peoples of the region. The Timmelsjoch was a particularly important route because it provided one of the most direct routes between the upper Inntal valley and Meran, the regional capital at the time, as well as Tirol Castle and St. Leonhard in Passeier, where the road forks to the Jaufenpass, down to Sterzing, and on to the Brenner Pass road. During that time, cart tracks were relatively few, and travelers, peddlers, and people leading pack animals tended to choose the shortest route.

From the end of the thirteenth century to the beginning of the fifteenth century, the Timmelsjoch facilitated increased trade. Ötztaler Kraxenträger (basket bearers) transported flax, livestock, cured bacon, lard, vinegar, wine, and spirits across the pass. These early traders routes and techniques that would later inspire modern alpinists. The name "Thymelsjoch" first appeared in 1241 in a letter written by the Bavarian Count of Eschenlohe. For centuries, the spelling "Thimmeljoch" was widely used. The current spelling came into usage only in the twentieth century during the construction of the paved road.

Timmelsjoch Hochalpenstrasse

The first plans to build a road across the Timmelsjoch were drawn up in 1897, when the Tyrolean Landtag (regional assembly) established a construction agenda which comprised the building of several "rival roads" including a road over the Timmelsjoch. Work would not begin until the autumn of 1955. On July 7, 1959, after four years of construction, the  road was finally opened to the public. The Timmelsjoch Hochalpenstrasse was well-engineered and integrated into the landscape.

While the road up from the Ötztal valley was built for tourism purposes, the situation in the Passeier Valley (on the southern side) was very different. As in many other parts of the Italian Alps, Mussolini, the ruler from 1922 to 1945, had numerous military roads built up towards Italy's international borders. Construction of the road from Moos in Passeier, 10 km southeast from the pass, commenced in the 1930s. After the meeting between Mussolini and Hitler on the Brenner in 1939, construction work ceased. The road was narrow and rough, but had almost been completed. The last  tunnel had been dug through; just the remaining 2 km stretch from its end to the pass had not been built. The tunnel partly collapsed in the following years. From 1939 to the mid-1960s, the unfinished, grassed-over road was only used for forestry purposes. Construction work resumed in the mid-1960s and the road was completed to the pass and opened to through traffic in 1967.

The road on the Ötztal valley side is called the Timmelsjoch Hochalpenstrasse. The pass is now popular with car and motorbike tourists. Due to its elevation, steepness, and narrow road, the Timmelsjoch pass is closed to lorries and vehicles with trailers. With its dramatic scenery, particularly on the southern side, the road has become popular with cyclists. On the last Sunday in August, several thousand cyclists take part in the Ötztaler Cycling Marathon crawl up the  section from St. Leonhard in Passeier to the pass, gaining —the fourth and final pass included in the grueling  marathon.

Timmelsjoch pass

The Timmelsjoch pass is open to traffic from approximately the first half of June to the second half of October (the exact dates depend on snow conditions) daily from 7:00 am to 8:00 pm. The Ötztal valley side is subject to a toll charge. At the Timmelsjoch pass, the Rasthaus summit tavern offers travelers warm meals and drinks and a sun terrace. Overlooking the Rasthaus is a stone mountain hut with a summit cross nearby.

Several stone markers in the area indicate the Austria-Italy border.

See also
 List of highest paved roads in Europe
 List of mountain passes

Gallery

Panorama

References

External links

Profile on climbbybike.com
Picture from the Timmelsjoch
Timmelsjoch Hochalpenstrasse homepage
Cycling up to the Timmelsjoch: data, profile, map, photos and description

Mountain passes of the Alps
Mountain passes of Tyrol (state)
Mountain passes of South Tyrol
Austria–Italy border crossings